The Marnes de Villers is a geologic formation in France. It preserves fossils dating back to the Late Jurassic period.

Paleofauna
Allosauroidea indet. - possible metriacanthosaurid
Leedsichthys
Megalosauridae indet. - Similar to Torvosaurus
?Streptospondylus - tentative referral based on similarities with Eustreptospondylus (may not be from the formation)

See also

 List of fossiliferous stratigraphic units in France

References
 

Jurassic France
Jurassic System of Europe
Oxfordian Stage